The Anglo-Arabian or Anglo-Arab is a crossbred,  part-Arabian horse that now also has its own status as a horse breed. It is the result of a Thoroughbred (hence, the prefix "Anglo") being crossed with an Arabian. The cross can be made between a Thoroughbred stallion and an Arabian mare, or vice versa. It can also be a cross between either an Anglo-Arab and a Thoroughbred or, alternatively, an Anglo-Arab and an Arabian. Another permitted cross is between two Anglo-Arabians.  No matter the cross, a horse must have a minimum 12.5% of Arabian blood to be considered an Anglo-Arabian.

France is one of the greatest producers of Anglo-Arabians. The French Anglo-Arab traces back to two stallions: the Arabian stud Massoud and Aslam, a "Turkish" horse, probably of the now-extinct Turkoman or "Turkmene" breed. These Syrian imports were then crossed with a trio of Thoroughbreds, specifically, the Comus Mare, the Selim Mare, and Daer. Some years later, three of their daughters — Clovis, Danae, and Delphine — formed the foundation of the French Anglo-Arabian breeding program.  The program's primary Anglo-Arab breeding farm, Pompadour National Anglo-Arab Stud, is located in Arnac-Pompadour, a commune of central France's Corrèze department, home to the famous Château de Pompadour. In addition, the area serves as the French National Stud's headquarters. Other state-owned studs of Tarbes, Villeneuve-sur-Lot and Pau were instrumental in promoting the breed. The Tarbais horses in particular, Anglo-Arabs bred in the area around Tarbes, were celebrated in their time. The Anglo-Arab possesses one of France's oldest studbooks, and the Selle Français, the country's leading sport horse, still bears the stamp of significant Anglo-Arab influence. In recent years the breed has suffered from a fall in popularity. 

In the past, the Anglo-Arab has been used for cavalry remount purposes. However, at present, its most prominent occupation is that of a general riding or sport horse. The breed does well in eventing, due to its stamina, speed, and jumping ability. In the United States, the Anglo-Arabian is considered a "part-bred" Arabian and, as a result, is registered within a separate section of the Arabian Horse Association.

Breed Characteristics

As a  result of  different crosses that can produce an Anglo-Arabian, the size and appearance are noticeably variable. However, on average, an Anglo-Arabian is a bit taller than the average Arabian and of somewhat less refined type. The largest horses are usually produced by breeding a Thoroughbred mare to an Arabian stallion. The best examples of this breed inherit the refinement, good bone, and endurance of the Arabian, as well as the speed and scope of the Thoroughbred.

The most common colors are chestnut, bay (sometimes called "brown"), or gray. The breed ideal is for a horse to have conformation that more strongly resembles the Arabian, though they should not look entirely like either a Thoroughbred or an Arabian. They have a long neck, prominent withers, a compact and strong body (sturdier than the Thoroughbred), a deep chest, and solid bone. Anglo-Arabians should have small, fine heads, similar to an Arabian, but they should not be overly "dished" in profile.

See also
Zweibrücker
Arabian horse
Thoroughbred
Sardinian Anglo-Arab
Gidran
List of horse breeds

References
 Arnac - Pompadour
 Pays de Pompador – Horse Town

Part-Arabian breeds of horses and ponies